The Tone River is a river of the Marlborough Region of New Zealand's South Island.

See also
List of rivers of New Zealand

References

Rivers of the Marlborough Region
Rivers of New Zealand